Lerrnakert or Lernakert may refer to:
Lernakert, Gegharkunik, Armenia
Lernakert, Shirak, Armenia